The 2021 Cupa României is the 107th season of Romania's national rugby union cup competition since it inauguration in 1914. In this edition of the Romanian Cup, the number of participating teams has decreased from six teams to five, because of the financial troubles that ACS Tomitanii Constanța have succumbed to, meaning they will not participate in this year`s competition.

Teams

Note: Flags indicate national union as has been defined under WR eligibility rules. Players may hold more than one non-WR nationality

Tables

Group A

Fixtures & Results

Round 1

Round 2

Round 3

Round 4

Round 5

Round 6

Group B

Fixtures & Results

Round 1

Round 2

Semifinals

1st Place Final

External links
 rugbyromania.ro – Official Website

References

2020–21 in Romanian rugby union